David Leha, known professionally as Radical Son, is a Kamilaroi  and Tongan singer. He was part of the GetUp Mob, which released a cover version of "From Little Things Big Things Grow" in May 2008 – it reached No. 4 on the ARIA Singles Chart. Other members of the temporary group were the song's writers Kev Carmody and Paul Kelly together with Urthboy, Missy Higgins, Mia Dyson, Jane Tyrrell, Dan Sultan, Joel Wenitong and Ozi Batla.

Radical Son's second studio album, Cause 'n Effect was released through Wanton music in October 2014 and features appearances from Archie Roach,  Emma Donovan, and Deline Briscoe. He was a cast member of The Rabbits with music by Kate Miller-Heidke, an opera by based on the book The Rabbits by John Marsden and Shaun Tan. The Rabbits won four Helpmann Awards.  In 2016 Radical Son performed at WOMADelaide.

In 2017 he recorded "Leave them Tents Alone!!", sung to the tune of Pink Floyd's "Another Brick in the Wall (Part II)", to protest the subsequent removal of homeless people's tents and belongings by Sydney City Council from the centre of Sydney.

Discography

Albums

References

External links
 Radical Son web page

Australian male singers
Indigenous Australian musicians
Living people
Year of birth missing (living people)